Secondary Highway 524, commonly referred to as Highway 524, is a provincially maintained highway in the Canadian province of Ontario. It was established in 1956, along with most of the secondary highway system in the province, and has remained unchanged since then.

Route description 
Highway 524 is a brief route connecting Highway 522 with Highway 534. It begins at Farleys Corners, and travels north alongside a farm, quickly curving to the northeast. The highway enters a forest, where it meets Commanda Lake Road; soon thereafter, it crosses the Commanda Creek.

After crossing the creek over a single laned bailey bridge, Highway 524 curves northwest, intersecting Weller Road, and follows the creek downstream. Emerging into cleared fields, the highway meets Pilgers Road and turns northwest, briefly, before curving north. The highway ends soon thereafter in the community of Carr.

History 
Highway 524 was assumed in early 1956, when secondary highways were first designated with numbers.
The route was a gravel road when it was designated,
and was paved between 1978 and 1980.
The route has remained unchanged since then.

Major intersections

References

External links 

 Highway 524

524
Roads in Parry Sound District